Fool's Mate is a 1989 West German drama film by the director Mathieu Carrière. The film was screened in the Un Certain Regard section at the 1989 Cannes Film Festival.

Cast
 Victoria Tennant as Alice Gordon
 Stuart Wilson as Nikos Mitradis
  as Lucas Tillman
 María Barranco as Teresa
 Anatoly Karpov as Chess player (actual two-time World Chess Champion)
 Alexandar Rasic as Alex
 Clayton George as Clarence White
 Mareike Carrière as Judy Miller
 Peter Sattmann as Häusermann
 Harvey Friedman as Blind Chessplayer
 Mathieu Carrière as Herbert
 Harry Baer

References

External links

1989 films
1989 drama films
West German films
German drama films
1980s English-language films
English-language German films
1980s German-language films
Films directed by Mathieu Carrière
Films about chess
Films about gambling
1980s German films